André Labeylie (30 January 1926 – 31 July 1998) was a French racing cyclist. He rode in the 1951 Tour de France.

References

External links
 

1926 births
1998 deaths
French male cyclists
Place of birth missing